Grêmio Recreativo e Esportivo, commonly referred to as Grêmio Recreativo, is a currently inactive Brazilian football club based in Espigão d'Oeste, Rondônia.

History
The club was founded on 1 May 1984. Espigão finished in the second place in the Campeonato Rondoniense in 1992, losing the competition to Ji-Paraná, and finished in the second place in the Campeonato Rondoniense Second Level in 2005, losing the competition to Ulbra Ji-Paraná.

Stadium
Grêmio Recreativo play their home games at Estádio Municipal Luizinho Turatti, nicknamed Espigão. The stadium has a maximum capacity of 2,000 people.

References

Inactive football clubs in Brazil
Association football clubs established in 1984
Football clubs in Rondônia
1984 establishments in Brazil